Laconiko is a brand of olive oils exported from Peloponnese, Greece, which is in the region of Laconia. The brand produces a variety of extra virgin olive oils, flavored olive oils, balsamic vinegars, and wine vinegars from only the Koroneiki variety of olives. They are included in the Official Index of the World’s Best Olive Oils.

History 
Vasilios Pierrakos, a third-generation olive oil farmer, continued his family's work of producing olive oil in the mid 1900s. In the spring of 2009, his two sons, Diamantis and Diante Pierrakos, officially founded the company, Laconiko, which at the time was named “Our Family Olive Oil.”

Products 
The brand only produces extra virgin olive oil, which comes from their olive grove in Greece. The tasting notes include green olives, banana, and hints of almond. With an acidity of less than 0.8%, the olive oil is categorized as “extra-virgin," and has to be harvested when the olives are exactly ripe. This also means that there is no refined oil, no chemical treatments, and no taste defects. The brand has been recognized internationally for these attributes numerous times. In 2018, Laconiko's "Olio Nuevo" won Gold at the Athena International Olive Oil Competition in Delphi for "Best Koroneiki," and the same olive oil also won Gold at NYIOOC World Olive Oil Competition in New York City. Their "Laconiko Kambos" olive has been recognized at NYIOOC as well. Laconiko's extra virgin olive oil has also been recognized in Canada at the Canada International Olive Oil Competition and in Asia at Olive Japan 2021.

In addition to the regular extra virgin olive oil, Laconiko also produces over 22 types of flavored olive oil that are sold internationally.

References

External links 

 Official Website

Olive oil
Brand name condiments
Peloponnese
2009 establishments in Virginia
Food and drink companies based in Virginia